SDI Technologies is an American Rahway, New Jersey-based consumer electronics manufacturer whose products are marketed under several national brands, including Timex, eKids, KIDdesigns, and iHome. SDI used to market under Soundesign, a now-defunct brand. SDI Technologies had 110 employees as of 2007, and has a distribution network that covers over 70 countries. Including Asia, SDI employs over 400 people.

History
SDI Technologies was founded as Realtone Electronics in 1956 by Saul Ashkenazi and Ely Ashkenazi. In that year, the company introduced one of the first pocket cigarette lighters and one of the first transistor radios. Realtone went public in 1961. It introduced the Soundesign brand of high-end audio components in 1963, and the company changed its name to Soundesign in 1968. Soundesign returned to being a privately-held company in 1982. The company was renamed again, this time to its current name, in 1994.

Products

Soundesign
Soundesign, the defunct flagship division of SDI Technologies originally known as RealTone, marketed inexpensive home and portable electronics. The Soundesign brand faded as SDI began selling its products under the Zenith brand in 1993. SDI's current offerings include small electronics of the iHome and Timex brands.

iHome
Created in 2005, the iHome division produces docking stations, headphones, smart home devices, and other accessories. iHome speakers are able to stream music over Apple AirPlay, Bluetooth, as well as via a wired connection.  In addition to playing music wirelessly, some systems can act as a charging station for many devices when connected. Their compatibility ranges from smartphones, MP3 players, iPods, tablets, and many more. Some iHome accessories act as a docking station so that users with tablets can use a physical keyboard rather than the one provided on-screen with many devices. iHome also produces several smart home accessories such as smart outlets and motion detectors, which are compatible with Apple HomeKit, Samsung SmartThings, Wink, as well as others.

References

External links
 Official website

Electronics companies established in 1956
Rahway, New Jersey
Companies based in Union County, New Jersey